is  the former head coach of the Rizing Zephyr Fukuoka in the Japanese B.League.

Head coaching record

|- 
| style="text-align:left;"|Takamatsu Five Arrows
| style="text-align:left;"|2010-11
| 48||10||38|||| style="text-align:center;"|9th in Western|||-||-||-||
| style="text-align:center;"|-
|- 
| style="text-align:left;"|Rizing Fukuoka
| style="text-align:left;"|2012
| 22||14||8|||| style="text-align:center;"|5th in Western|||2||0||2||
| style="text-align:center;"|Lost in 1st round
|- 
| style="text-align:left;"|Rizing Fukuoka
| style="text-align:left;"|2012-13
| 52||34||18|||| style="text-align:center;"|2nd in Western|||4||3||1||
| style="text-align:center;"|Western Champions
|- 
| style="text-align:left;"|TGI D-Rise
| style="text-align:left;"|2013-14
| 32||17||15|||| style="text-align:center;"|4th|||2||1||1||
| style="text-align:center;"|3rd
|- 
| style="text-align:left;"|Yamagata Wyverns
| style="text-align:left;"|2014-15
| 32||10||22|||| style="text-align:center;"|7th|||-||-||-||
| style="text-align:center;"|-
|- 
| style="text-align:left;"|Yamagata Wyverns
| style="text-align:left;"|2015-16
| 36||23||13|||| style="text-align:center;"|4th|||2||0||2||
| style="text-align:center;"|4th
|-

References

1978 births
Living people

Japanese basketball coaches

Kagawa Five Arrows coaches
Passlab Yamagata Wyverns coaches
Rizing Zephyr Fukuoka coaches
University of Tsukuba alumni